Udayan Mane (born 24 February 1991) is an Indian professional golfer. He currently plays on the Asian Tour and the Professional Golf Tour of India. He has won 11 times on the Professional Golf Tour of India.

Amateur career
Mane was the leading amateur in India in 2014. He represented India in both the 2014 Asian Games and the 2014 Eisenhower Trophy.

Professional career
Mane turned professional in early 2015 and had a successful first season, winning twice on the Professional Golf Tour of India. He had three more wins in 2017 and has a total of 11 wins on the tour. He has also played a number of events on the Asian Tour. His highest finish on the tour was when he was tied for 6th place in the 2018 Bank BRI Indonesia Open.

Mane qualified for the 2020 Summer Olympics in Tokyo, Japan and will represent India in the men's individual event. He was not in the list of qualifiers published on 22 June, after the end of the qualifying period, but got a place when the Argentine Emiliano Grillo later withdrew. With a world ranking of 356 on 21 June, Mane was the highest-ranked eligible replacement. He was the lowest ranked player in the men's event.

Professional wins (12)

Professional Golf Tour of India wins (12)

Source:

Team appearances
Amateur
Eisenhower Trophy (representing India): 2014
Asian Games (representing India): 2014

References

External links

Indian male golfers
Asian Tour golfers
Olympic golfers of India
Golfers at the 2020 Summer Olympics
Golfers at the 2014 Asian Games
Asian Games competitors for India
Sportspeople from Bangalore
1991 births
Living people